The Winona and St. Peter Railroad Freight House is a former freight house in Winona, Minnesota, United States.  Built from 1882 to 1883, it is the city's last surviving freight facility of the Winona and St. Peter Railroad.  The building was listed on the National Register of Historic Places in 1984 for having local significance in the theme of transportation.  It was nominated as a symbol of the Winona and St. Peter Railroad, which was instrumental in spurring Winona's industry and growth by developing markets along its rail lines across Minnesota and into Dakota Territory.

Through mergers and acquisitions, the building continued to serve as a railroad office and freight house until 1961.  As of 2017 the west end of the building houses the Jefferson Pub & Grill, which keeps vintage railroad photographs and memorabilia on display.

See also
 National Register of Historic Places listings in Winona County, Minnesota

References

External links

 Jefferson Pub & Grill

1883 establishments in Minnesota
1961 disestablishments in Minnesota
Buildings and structures in Winona, Minnesota
National Register of Historic Places in Winona County, Minnesota
Railway buildings and structures on the National Register of Historic Places in Minnesota
Railway freight houses on the National Register of Historic Places
Transport infrastructure completed in 1883